Single Shot may refer to:

 Single-shot cinematography, also known as a long take, in which film is shot uninterrupted for an atypically long time
 Single-shot firearms, firearms which hold only a single round of ammunition
 Single-shot game, a subject of game theory
 Single-shot comic, a term used in the American comic book industry to denote a pilot comic 
 A single shot of espresso coffee, also called a solo
 Single-shot spectrography measures the energy of a single particle or a single bunch of particles
 A single-shot spin measurement reads out the spin of an individual electron, atom, atomic nucleus or qubit